Bill C-38 is the name of various legislation introduced into the House of Commons of Canada, including:

 Farm Debt Mediation Act, introduced in 1997 to the second session of the 35th Parliament
 Civil Marriage Act, introduced in 2005 to the only session of the 38th Parliament
 Jobs, Growth and Long-term Prosperity Act, introduced in 2012 to the first session of the 41st Parliament

Canadian federal legislation